= Orbis Education and Care =

Autism care and education provider in UK

Orbis Education and Care is a provider of schools, residential homes and facilities for children and adults with a diagnosis of autism based in Cardiff. It runs 16 schools, residential homes and facilities for children and adults in Wales and employs about 650 people.

Lucy Pottinger is the head of education.

It opened a new facility in Port Talbot in 2016.

It was founded by Andrew McCarthy in 2005. He sold it to August Equity for £28 million in 2017. It bought Pembrokeshire Resource Centre, which trades as Bangeston Autism Care Services, and operates four sites in Pembrokeshire, in 2017.

It commissioned classroom pods, specially designed for autistic pupils from the IAD Company in 2019. Six of the expandable structures were built at Ty Bronllys, near Brecon. They are designed to "help students at feel at ease with their surroundings and to promote the sense of going on an adventure every day, rather than to school.”

It is planning to open a school and residential home which will accommodate 30 pupils with complex needs in Tewkesbury, its first facility in England, in 2019.
